Breath of Heaven: A Holiday Collection is a Christmas compilation album by Grover Washington Jr., mostly on soprano saxophone, released in 1997 and nominated for a Grammy in 1998. Dawn Andrews contributes vocals and cello. Billy Childs contributes piano. It was also the last album released during his lifetime as he died less than three months later on December 17, 1999. His next album, Aria, was released posthumously on March 7, 2000.

Reception
Scott Yanow of AllMusic commented "For this set of Christmas-related songs, Grover Washington Jr. (mostly on soprano but also contributing some tenor and alto) sounds soulful but restrained. The renditions are lightly funky, atmospheric, and generally quite dull. Billy Childs is excellent on piano, and the musicianship of the other players is fine, but the similarity of moods and grooves, along with the somber feel of most of the music, makes this a surprisingly tedious listen".

Track listing 
 "Have Yourself a Merry Little Christmas" (Ralph Blane, Hugh Martin) – 4:56
 "Breath of Heaven (Mary's Song)" (Chris Eaton, Amy Grant) – 6:59
 "The Love in His Infant Eyes" (Donald Robinson, Grover Washington Jr.) – 4:27
 "Away in a Manger" – 5:56
 "I Wonder as I Wander" – 5:23
 "Christmas Time Is Here" (Vince Guaraldi, Lee Mendelssohn) – 5:04
 "The Magi's Song/A Child Is Born" (Joe Locke/Thad Jones)– 4:56
 "Jesu, Joy of Man's Desiring" (Johann Sebastian Bach) – 4:22
 "The Christmas Song" (Mel Tormé, Robert Wells) – 4:33
 "The Christmas Waltz" (Sammy Cahn, Jule Styne) – 4:47
 "Christmas Day Chant" – 3:41
 "Breath of Heaven (Mary's Song, Instrumental Version)" (Eaton, Grant) – 5:18

Personnel 
 Grover Washington Jr. – alto saxophone (1, 3, 4, 8), soprano saxophone (2, 5, 7, 8, 10, 11, 12), arrangements (5), tenor saxophone (6, 8, 9)
 Hiram Bullock – keyboards (1), arrangements (1, 9), guitars (2, 6, 12), electric guitar (4, 9), acoustic guitar (5, 10)
 Billy Childs – acoustic piano (1, 2, 5-8, 10, 12), keyboards (4, 9), arrangements (4, 5, 8, 10)
 Joe Locke – keyboards (2, 7, 11, 12), arrangements (2, 6, 7, 11, 12), chimes (5), vibraphone (5, 7, 8, 11), marimba (11)
 Donald Robinson – acoustic piano (3), keyboards (3), arrangements (3)
 Adam Holzman – synthesizers (3)
 Will Lee – bass (1, 2, 4-10, 12)
 Gerald Veasley – bass (3)
 Steven Wolf – drums (1, 3, 4, 9)
 Victor Lewis – drums (2, 5-8, 10, 12
 Pablo Batista – percussion (1, 3, 9)
 Bashiri Johnson – percussion (5, 7)
 Dawn Andrews – cello (2, 11, 12), vocals (11)
 Lisa Fischer – vocals (2)

Production 
 Todd Barkan – producer
 Donald Robinson – producer 
 Rudy Van Gelder – engineer, mixing, mastering 
 Maureen Sickler – assistant engineer
 Paul Silverthorne – production coordinator
 Christine Washington – production coordinator
 Sven Granert – product manager 
 Kiku Yamaguchi – art direction
 Alice Butts – design
 David Ellis – illustrations
 Norman Jean Roy – photography

References

Grover Washington Jr. albums
1997 Christmas albums
Christmas compilation albums
1997 compilation albums
Columbia Records Christmas albums
Christmas albums by American artists
Jazz Christmas albums